Roscoe Drummond (1902–1983) was a 20th-century American political journalist, editor, and syndicated Washington columnist, known for his long association with The Christian Science Monitor and 50-year syndicated column "State of the Nation", serving as director of information for the Marshall Plan, and co-founding Freedom House.

Background

James Roscoe Drummond was born January 13, 1902, in Theresa, New York, to John Henry and Georgia Estella (Peppers) Drummond. In 1924, he received his degree in journalism from Syracuse University

Career

On the same day he received his degree in 1924, Drummond joined the staff of The Christian Science Monitor. He worked as a reporter, assistant city editor, assistant to executive editor and chief editorial writer between the years 1924 and 1930. He was European editorial manager (1930–33); general news editor and member of editorial board (1933–34); and executive editor (1934–40). In 1940 he was named chief of the bureau in Washington, D.C., a position he held until 1953.

Drummond took a leave to serve as European director of information for the Marshall Plan (1949–1951) with the Economic Cooperation Administration in Paris. A founding member of Freedom House in 1941, he was a member of the board of trustees (1962–67) and served as its vice-chair.

From 1953 to 1955 he was chief of the Washington bureau of the New York Herald Tribune.

Personal and death

Drummond died of a heart ailment September 30, 1983.

Legacy

Drummond is best known for a political column he wrote for more than 50 years, called "State of the Nation". Syndicated by the Los Angeles Times, the column was carried by 150 newspapers in the U.S. and abroad, and reflected Drummond's Republican point of view. He began writing the column in 1951, succeeding Joseph C. Harsch; he stopped writing the column in 1981 after he was injured in an automobile accident.

Works

He was co-author (with Gaston Coblentz) of Duel at the Brink (1960), a book about Secretary of State John Foster Dulles. Drummond was writing his memoirs and a mystery novel at the time of his death at the New Jersey nursing home where he had lived since his car accident in 1981.

References

External links
 Finding Aid, Roscoe Drummond Papers at Georgetown University
Roscoe Drummond Papers at Syracuse University
 

1902 births
1983 deaths
Journalists from New York (state)
Syracuse University alumni
People from Theresa, New York
20th-century American non-fiction writers
The Christian Science Monitor people
20th-century American journalists
American male journalists
20th-century American male writers